The Adjustable Ranging Telescope (ART) system, developed and patented by James M. Leatherwood, combines a range-finding scale inside of a telescopic sight (scope) with an adjustable cam integrated into the scope's mount. This raises or lowers the rear of the sight to compensate for the ballistic rise or fall of the projectile.  The cam is preset for a specific cartridge, i.e., the 7.62 mm NATO round. Due to the fact that the range cam is locked to the magnification ring, the range is automatically set, and the ballistic fall of the shot is accounted for. This then allows the shooter to place the optic's aiming point directly on the target.

During the Vietnam War, Lieutenant Leatherwood, who already had the patents for his ART system, entered the Army and began working with U.S. Army Ordnance specialists. The combination of the Leatherwood Adjustable Ranging Telescope (ART) with M14 National Match rifles went on to create the M21 Sniper Rifle.

References

Firearm sights